Lisa Anne Callif (born January 6, 1974) is an American entertainment attorney specializing in independent film. She works in all aspects of the field with a focus on clearance work – enabling filmmakers to use a limited amount of unlicensed material in their projects with the U.S. Copyright Law's fair use doctrine.

In 2008, Callif became a named partner at the Beverly Hills law firm Donaldson & Callif. She has worked on such documentary films as I'm Still Here, Waiting for Superman and Inside Job. Filmmakers she has worked with include: Oliver Stone, Jason Blum and Elise Pearlstein. She is an adjunct associate professor of law at Southwestern Law School in Los Angeles.

As an author
In 2010, Callif released The American Bar Association's Legal Guide to Independent Film Making, which she co-authored with law partner Michael C. Donaldson, whose book Clearance & Copyright: Everything the Independent Filmmaker Needs to Know is used as a textbook in over 50 college and university film schools across America.

Recognition
In 2011 Callif was named one of "The Best and the Brightest" of Hollywood Law by Variety magazine.

Bibliography
 The American Bar Association's Legal Guide To Independent Filmmaking (2010) (by Lisa A. Callif & Michael C. Donaldson)

References

External links
 Official website

1974 births
American women lawyers
California lawyers
Lawyers from Los Angeles
Living people
New York University alumni
Southwestern Law School alumni
21st-century American women